West Air, Inc. is an American airline based in Fresno, California, owned by Empire Airlines.  It provides feeder service on behalf of FedEx Express throughout California and parts of Nevada and Utah.

History 
The airline also operated from Mexico through its associate company Westair de Mexico (now defunct) with Fairchild Metro III aircraft. On 31 December 2021, West Air was acquired by Empire Airlines.

Fleet 
As of September 2015 the West Air fleet includes:

References

External links 
 

Cargo airlines of the United States
Companies based in Fresno County, California
Companies based in Fresno, California
Airlines based in California
Airlines established in 1988